The 2010 Fort Wayne Firehawks season was the first season for the Continental Indoor Football League (CIFL) franchise. In November 2009, the FireHawks were announced as the successor team to the Fort Wayne Freedom. Owners J. Michael Loomis and John Christner purchased the assets left from the Freedom franchise, who had played the two seasons before the FireHawks were announced. Christner's first action as General Manager was naming former Freedom head coach Willie Davis as the team's first head coach. On December 9, 2009, it was confirmed that Loomis and Christner would take over the entities that used to run the Freedom. Before the season started, the team announced they had signed Katie Hnida as the team's placekicker. Hnida is best known for becoming the first woman to score a point in an NCAA football game and speaking out during the recruiting scandal at her first school, the University of Colorado.

According to The Journal Gazette in 2011, former players said they were still owed from the 2010 season. Team owner Mike Loomis did not confirm or deny the reports in that article. The team drew about 2,000 fans per game, according to CIFL stats.

Players

Signings

Final roster

Staff

Schedule

Regular season

Standings

Regular season results

Week 4: vs. Cincinnati Commandos
The FireHawks suffered a loss in their first game as a franchise April 2, 2010, a 55–27 loss to the Cincinnati Commandos. During the game, the FireHawks also lost their quarterback, Adam Gibson, during the game, leaving the FireHawks searching for another quarterback before the next week.

Week 5: vs. Miami Valley Silverbacks
The FireHawks earned their first victory April 10, 2010, 44–28 against the Miami Valley Silverbacks, as new quarterback, Kota Carone-Colors, paced the team with seven touchdown passes.

Week 6: vs. Wisconsin Wolfpack
Throughout the season the team experienced many ups and downs, none lower than a 0–49 defeat at the hands of the Wisconsin Wolfpack. Three weeks into the season, the FireHawks received a blow, when co-owner and general manager John Christner left the organization, leaving Loomis as the sole owner.

Week 7: vs. Chicago Cardinals
The FireHawks' showed no effects from the front office problems, as the following week the team came out and defeated the Chicago Cardinals 69–45, but the team played without Hnida, as a blood clot on her foot put her out for the season.

Week 8: vs. Wisconsin Wolfpack
The FireHawks got a quick chance at revenge against the Wolfpack, but they failed losing 32–33 as they couldn't score from the 1-yard line with seconds left, as backup quarterback, Mike Whitaker's pass sailed over the hands of Jermaine Woolfolk. The FireHawks didn't dress a kicker during the game, citing "low ceilings" as the reason not to dress the team's new kicker, David McLane, an intern for the team.

Week 9: vs. Miami Valley Silverbacks
The FireHawks won their next game against Miami Valley, 26–8.

Week 10: vs. Marion Mayhem
During the week before the team's first game at the Marion Mayhem, Loomis stated that the team would continue to play despite its mounting financial struggles. The Mayhem, who were having financial problems of their own, forced the FireHawks next game back to June 12.

Week 11: vs. Cincinnati Commandos
The FireHawks continued their season the following week against the undefeated Commandos, losing 46–49 after leading by 12 with 4:12 left in the game.

Week 12: vs. Marion Mayhem
The team was scheduled to the Mayhem the next week, but before they played the FireHawks the franchise folded. The folding of Marion credited the FireHawks with two forfeit wins, but hurt the team financially by costing them a home game. Because the Mayhem didn't finish the season, several of Marion's players were signed by Fort Wayne in the subsequent weeks to join in the FireHawks' playoff run.

Week 14: vs. Chicago Cardinals
The FireHawks went to Chicago and shutout the Cardinals 48–0. The FireHawks finished 6–4 during the 2010 Continental Indoor Football League season, earning a third-seed in the playoffs.

Postseason

Schedule

Postseason results

Semifinals: vs. Wisconsin Wolfpack
In the first playoff game in team history, the FireHawks lost to the second-place Wolfpack, 25–24.

Stats

Passing

Rushing

Receiving

CIFL awards
Co-Defensive Player of the Year - Tramaine Billie
Special Teams Player of the Year - Mike Tatum (Also played with the Marion Mayhem during 2010 season)

1st Team All-CIFL
WR Justin Wynn
LB Tramaine Billie
KR Mike Tatum

2nd Team All-CIFL
C Anothony Harrison
DE Brodrick Johnson
DE Thomas McKenzie (Also played with the Marion Mayhem during 2010 season)
DB Paul Carter

References

External links
 2010 stats

2010 Continental Indoor Football League season
Sports in Fort Wayne, Indiana
Fort Wayne Firehawks
Fort Wayne FireHawks